Happy Town may refer to:

 Happy Town (TV series), a 2010 television series on ABC
 Happy Town (album), a 1997 album by Jill Sobule
 Happy Town (musical), a 1959 Broadway musical
 Happy Town (game), a 2019 video game